Cutler's resin, also known as cutler's pitch, is a waterproofing adhesive made by including wax when making a pine pitch glue. Cutler's resin commonly consists  of pine pitch, beeswax and/or carnauba wax, and usually employs a filler like charcoal, sawdust and/or animal dung to help secure a blade or device to a handle. It has been used for centuries to attach knife and sword handles, and as a fastener for other tools and weapons. The word cutler means "one who makes knives".

References

Synthetic resins